Cristina Balaban is a retired Romanian swimmer who won a bronze medal in the 100 m backstroke at the 1966 European Aquatics Championships. This was the first European swimming medal for Romania. During her career she won 28 national titles and set 36 national records.

After retirement she worked as a swimming coach, under the name Balaban-Sopterian, training such competitors as Carmen Bunaciu and Anca Pătrășcoiu.

References

Living people
Romanian female backstroke swimmers
European Aquatics Championships medalists in swimming
Universiade medalists in swimming
Year of birth missing (living people)
Universiade bronze medalists for Romania
Medalists at the 1965 Summer Universiade